Bolu Province is a province situated in north-western Turkey. It is located between the capital, Ankara and the largest city in the country, Istanbul. It covers an area of 7,410 km2 and the population is 311,810.

The capital city of the province is Bolu.

Geography
The province is drained by the Bolu River (Boli Su) and the Koca River.

The forests, lakes and mountains are rich in wildlife including three deer species and popular weekend and holiday retreats for walkers and climbers.

Parts of the province are vulnerable to earthquakes.

History
It is not known when Bolu was first founded. There are some archaeological findings dating back about 100,000 years that suggest the region was inhabited then.

The area now in Bolu Province was in eastern Bithynia and southwestern Paphlagonia. The town of Bithynium from which the area takes its name is the modern Bolu. The area was called Bithynia during the Hellenistic period, the Romans named it Claudio Polis, and it was called Bolu by the Turks. By about 375 BCE, Bithynia had gained its independence from Persia under Artaxerxes II, and King Bas subsequently defeated Alexander's attempt to take it. The Bithynian region with parts of Paphlagonia remained its own kingdom until 88 BCE when it briefly came under Mithridates VI and the Kingdom of Pontus. With Roman help the last Bithynian king, Nicomedes IV regained his throne, but on his death bequeathed the kingdom to Rome. This led to the Third Mithridatic War and the fall of Pontus, the area was incorporated into the Roman Empire as a single province joining Paphlagonia with Bithynia. Under the falling Byzantine Empire the Bolu area was divided from western Bithynia at the Sakarya River, with western Bithynia keeping the name.  The Sakarya is still the southern and western boundary of the province.

The Byzantine Empire briefly lost the Bolu area to the Seljuk Turks after the 1071 Battle of Manzikert, but recovered it under Alexios I Komnenos. After the end of the Komnenos dynasty, the Turks gradually took the Bolu area back.

About 1240 the Seljuk Turks took the eastern part of the Bolu area (i.e. the Paphlagonian part) from the Byzantine Empire and incorporated it into the Sultanate of Rum. Due to their assistance in taking it and Sinop, the Chobanids were given that territory and adjacent areas to the north and east to rule. The Chobanids were relatively independent of the Sultan.  That eastern area fell under the Isfendiyarids between 1292 and 1461. In 1461 it was incorporated into the rest of the Ottoman Empire by Mehmed II.

By 1265, the western part of the Bolu area was again acquired by the Seljuk Turks, but it fell to the arms of Orhan and the Ottoman Empire in the early to mid-1300s.  The two areas were reunited in 1461, under Mehmed II. In the 1864 Ottoman Empire administrative reorganization, Bolu was created as an independent sanjak, although it was geographically part of the Kastamonu Vilayet.

Administrative divisions
Bolu province is divided into nine districts, four sub-districts, thirteen municipalities and 491 villages.

Districts

Bolu, the capital district
Dörtdivan
Gerede
Göynük
Kıbrıscık
Mengen
Mudurnu
Seben
Yeniçağa

Main sights

 Lake Abant, a mountain lake resort and hot springs
 Yedigöller National Park. The name means "seven lakes" in Turkish, referring to the number of lakes in this forest park.
 The Köroğlu Mountains, said to be the scene of the folk Epic of Köroğlu
 There are many hot springs and mineral baths in the province ( in Turkish).
 Kartalkaya, one of Turkey's most popular ski resorts
 Sarıalan, a lake high in the mountains above Kartalkaya
 The Aladağ mountains, including the trail and picnic area of Gölcük
 Seben Çeltikler
 Göynük Akshemseddin Mausoleum

Towns include:
 Mengen
 Mudurnu (the ancient town of Modrenea)
 Gerede

Gallery

See also
 List of populated places in Bolu Province

References

External links 

  
  Bolu municipality's official website